Rouh Rouhi is Najwa Karam's ninth studio album. It was released in 1999.

Track listing
 "Atchana" (Thirsty)
 "Ariftu Albi La Meen" (Do you know to whom my heart belongs?)
 "Rouh Rouhi" (Soul of my Soul)
 "Keef Bedaweek" (How do I cure you?)
 "Ma Birdha Ghirak" (I only want you)
 "Al Wafiyah" (The Faithful One)
 "In Raddayt Alayk" (If I answer you)

1999 albums
Najwa Karam albums
Rotana Records albums